Juan Carlos Franco (born 17 April 1973) is a former Paraguayan footballer who played as a midfielder.

Franco, a one club man, started and ended his career at Olimpia Asunción of Paraguay where he became a fan-favorite because of his loyalty and contributions to the club. He represented Paraguay at the 2002 FIFA World Cup.

Titles
Paraguayan League Champion: 1993, 1995, 1997, 1998, 1999, 2000 (with Olimpia Asunción)
Copa Libertadores: 2002 (with Olimpia Asunción)
Recopa Sudamericana: 2003 (with Olimpia Asunción)
Supercopa Sudamericana: 1990 (with Olimpia Asunción)

References

1973 births
Living people
Paraguayan footballers
Club Olimpia footballers
Paraguay international footballers
2002 FIFA World Cup players
Association football midfielders